Market Urbanism is an urban policy theory which advocates for the liberalization of urban planning and transportation policy. Market Urbanists support loosening  urban land use and zoning regulations, implementing congestion pricing on public roads, and applying classical liberal theory to urban policy issues.

Overview

Market Urbanism is a theory that is the cross between free-market policy and urban issues. Rooted from the classical liberal economic tradition, the theory calls for private-sector actions that create organic growth and voluntary exchange within cities, rather than ones enforced by government bureaucracy.

"Market Urbanists believe that were this model tried in cities, it would produce cheaper housing, faster transport, improved public services and better quality of life."

Housing 

Market Urbanism posits that the cause of high home prices is government regulation. Market Urbanists believe that the answer is to reduce the government's role, letting the market hinge upon private negotiation between developers & consumers.

Zoning 

According to a report from the United States Congress Joint Economic Committee, "high housing prices are primarily driven by restrictive land-use regulations that keep workers from moving to more productive labor markets, restrict economic growth, slow family formation, and worsen housing insecurity".

Market Urbanists are very cautious when it comes to subsidies, and much prefer free market dynamics to play out. For example, in an article in the National Review (a conservative editorial magazine) in August 2018, Jibran Khan comments that "...[Kamala] Harris' bill [which would give tax subsidies to renters] could compound the problems facing renters, by reducing the political pressure — currently building from both left and right in California via the “Market Urbanism” movement — to tackle the lack of housing."

Local governments have tried to address housing shortages, but often by tightening zoning regulations. It has been debated whether or not zoning is causing housing shortages rather than preventing them. Market Urbanists generally argue that zoning is causing housing shortages.

According to economist Robert F. Mulligan, "The greater the need for housing in particular cities, the more zoning constrains how housing shortages can be addressed, keeping housing needs from ever being satisfied. This results in low-income workers, who are often needed to perform essential service activities, having to pay exorbitant rents for substandard apartments, keeping their living standard low."

Parking Minimums 
Market Urbanists strongly believe that parking reform is needed and that free market ideas should be applied to parking. Parking reform discourages the building of too much parking supply and encourage more equitable, efficient and sustainable management of existing parking supply (usually by pricing parking).

A recent study by the Research Institute for Housing America closely examined the parking inventory of New York, Philadelphia, Seattle, Des Moines, and Jackson, Wyoming. Data from these satellite images, the U.S. Census, property tax assessment offices, city departments of transportation, parking authorities, and geospatial maps like Google Maps to generate inventories of parking for these five cities.  The study adds empirical evidence to the idea that American cities devote far too much space and far too many resources to parking. By presenting the first complete parking inventories for five U.S. cities, this research reveals an investment in parking that is out of balance with the current demand for parking in almost all cases, and even less in tune with what appears to be declining future demand.

Donald Shoup, an American engineer and professor in urban planning has been a voice in the parking reform movement. Shoup has extensively studied parking as a key link between transportation and land use, with important consequences for cities, the economy, and the environment. In a 2004 paper titled The Ideal Source of Local Public Revenue, Shoup argued for the application of Georgist tax theory to urban parking and transportation issues.

Market Urbanists strongly advocate for abolishing parking minimums, arguing that these regulations are costly and they increase home prices plus consume valuable urban space that could go for other uses. While their perceived benefit is to reduce externalities linked with new development, like spillover traffic, Market Urbanists argue that parking minimums cause more issues than they solve.

Urban Growth Boundaries 

"Urban growth boundaries (UGBs) are invisible lines that are drawn around certain metros, and represent where urbanized development must stop"

UGBs are generally enforced by regional bureaucracies, since they involve many municipalities working together and require periodic extension. Other localities have alternative forms of growth management that function like UGBs, and that are even less flexible.

Market urbanists believe that "regulations like urban growth boundaries and preservation reserves raise home costs and hinder urbanization. In some cases they even cause leapfrog sprawl, worsening the problem they aimed to stop."

Transportation 

Market Urbanists believe that a market-based mechanism for managing and delineating right-of-way should be created. One suggestion is open up space to transport companies, which can bid with each other for the right to use it.

Road pricing 

Market Urbanists agree that a way to reduce congestion and car-dependence is to price roads. According to Scott Beyer, "Road pricing’s main benefit is to manage demand, i.e. disperse it. A dynamically-priced road system spreads demand across the day; creates revenue to maintain roads; and encourages ride-pooling, as multiple people can outbid one person for road use."

Some market urbanists believe the solution is to build private roads.

According to Adam Hengels, there is an opportunity cost for roads only being public. "On top of lost revenue from tax-exempt bond issuance and property taxes, the fact that roads are not private means governments forgoes taxing a private operator of the roads as it would tax other private enterprises. Instead of being a source of corporate tax revenue, roads themselves drain government resources."

Public transit reform
Market Urbanists don't oppose public transit, but believe it needs structural reform.

Private transit

Market Urbanists favor allowing private companies to compete with the government. For example, government should not restrict the creation of private buses or private roads.

In addition, Market Urbanists propose that governments should allow private “micro-mobility” such as electronic bikes and scooters.

City Administration

Startup cities
The concept of startup cities has been gathering momentum over the past decade. It is the concept that startups can build new neighborhoods and cities.

Zach Caceres coined the term “Startup Cities” to describe neighborhoods and cities built by startup companies. From 2012 to 2016, he co-founded and led the Startup Cities Institute, an interdisciplinary research group, at Universidad Francisco Marroquín in Guatemala City.

References

Urban design
Transport systems
Transport infrastructure